Chhatrapati Shivaji Maharaj Museum of Indian History (CSMMIH) is a private historical museum founded by François Gautier in 2012 under the banner of his not-for-profit organization, the Foundation For Advancement of Cultural Ties (FACT). The first phase the museum was inaugurated by Ravi Shankar and endorsed by Ajit Pawar and Nitin Gadkari. In addition to various exhibits the museum also has a freely accessible digital library on their website that has hundreds of books on Indian history and culture.

Layout
The museum complex has twenty two buildings, each housing a unique exhibition. Among them are displays regarding Aurangzeb, based on his own firmans, on Maharana Pratap, the only Rajput to fight the Mughals and win; Dara Shikoh, two exhibitions on the great Chhatrapati Shivaji Maharaj, as well numerous exhibitions on women warriors, like Alyabhai Holkar, Tarabai of Maharashtra, Rani Kittur Chennama of Karnataka. Francois Gautier also wanted to highlight the suffering of Hindus throughout the ages, thus there are exhibitions on the Portuguese Inquisition, Tippu Sultan, the Hindu Holocaust. The museum complex also has one of the two temples in India dedicated to Bharat Mata (Mother India). The architect of the Bharat Mata temple and the future Museum is MRS Sheetal Harpale of Pune.

The museum houses a series of exhibitions, for example, a miniature painting exhibition on the life of Shivaji, a 17th-century Indian king; an exhibition on Hindu tolerance throughout the ages; and another exhibition that "scientifically refutes the Aryan invasion theory".

In July 2013, the 14th Dalai Lama inaugurated a Tibetan pavilion showcasing an exhibition of text and pictures on the travails of people from Tibet over the last 60 years. An open exhibition on Dara Shikoh, was also inaugurated by Uddhav Thackeray.

The museum is open daily with free entrance. In 2022, it received 15,000 visitors, many of them school children. The future museum is proposed to cost about 17 crore rupees spread across an area of 100,000 square feet and will house 70 exhibitions with state of the art research and archival facilities. It will be in the shape of Swastika, an auspicious symbol in many Indic religions. It is scheduled to open in 2018.

Exhibits and exhibitions

Videos and documentaries produced by the museum
The museum has produced the following videos and documentaries:

 Christian conversions
 Kashmiri Pandits
 Brahmins and Upper castes
 The Trauma of Partition
 Mumbai train blasts
 26/11, The true story
 Biopic of Shivaji Maharaj
 The legend of Lachit Borpukan

See also
 Ahilyabai Holkar
 Chhatrapati Shivaji Maharaj Vastu Sangrahalaya
 Indian Museum

References

External links 
 Free ebooks at FACT website 

2012 establishments in Maharashtra
Museums established in 2012
History museums in India
Museums in Maharashtra
Buildings and structures in Pune district
Tourist attractions in Pune district